Melodies and Guns is a poetry collection in English, edited by Indira Goswami and authored by Megan Kachari, the arrested Central Publicity Secretary of ULFA. The original version is in Assamese with the title Memsahib Prithibi published in 1990. It was translated into English by Pradeep Acharya and Manjeet Baruah and published by UBS Publishers Distributors Ltd, Delhi in 2006. The preface of the book is written by Jnanpith Awardee Indira Goswami.

The book was released at the Frankfurt book fair in October 2006.

The author

Megan Kachari is the pseudonym of the author who is known as Mithinga Daimary. He was the Central Publicity Secretary of the banned outfit ULFA in Assam.

The poems
The readers and scholars of Assam highly appreciated the poems for their powerful portrayal of the experiences of life. "The fearlessness and spontaneity with which he expresses feelings is remarkable.", said noted scholar Professor Hiren Gohain. The poems focus on the lives of the militants and the pain and brutality that they have to undergo. "These are very different kind of poems. They have the smell of the gunpowder yet at the same time express great love for humanity. They certainly evoke a strange feeling.", said Dr Goswami, who was instrumental in getting the poems published.

Some noted poems
Some of his notable poems include:
Soon As Night Descends
You and I
The Way You Wish
The Throb of Life
The Beastly Darkness – Light
The Earth a Memsahib
Cradled Winter Hymns
Don't Talk Like that Magon and Stray Ramblings
The Waves
The Ancient River in Melancholy
The Void
This Clear the Water Pons
The Down Stream Song Words-It's Life Or...
World Cup of Football
A Dream Ode to Bird
Loneliness
Silver Nosepins
Gold Bangles
Pain
The Song
The Wounded Search

See also
Mithinga Daimary

References

External links
Indira Goswami's Blog

Assamese literature
Indian poetry collections
Books from Assam